The Metelitsa is a low-floor tram (streetcars) built by Stadler Rail designed for  tram networks.

Ordered Metelitsa trams

External links

Stadler Rail rolling stock
Tram vehicles of Russia
Passenger rail transport
Tram vehicles